Thomas Winklhofer (born December 30, 1970 in Seekirchen) is a retired Austria international footballer.

References

Honours
 Austrian Football Bundesliga winner: 1994, 1995, 1997, 2007.
 Austrian Supercup winner: 1994, 1995, 1997.

1970 births
Living people
Austrian footballers
Austria international footballers
Austrian Football Bundesliga players
FC Red Bull Salzburg players
1. FC Saarbrücken players
TSV Neumarkt players
Austrian expatriate footballers
Expatriate sportspeople in Germany
Austrian expatriate sportspeople in Germany

Association football defenders
FC Swarovski Tirol players
People from Salzburg-Umgebung District
Footballers from Salzburg (state)
WSG Tirol players